Lee Hyun-ho (born 14 July 1992) is a South Korean professional baseball pitcher who is currently playing for the Hanhwa Eagles of the Korea Baseball Organization. He graduated from Jemulpo High School and was selected to Doosan Bears by a draft in 2011.(2nd round)

References

External links 

 Career statistics and player information from Korea Baseball Organization
 Lee Hyun-ho at Doosan Bears Baseball Club

Living people
KBO League players
KBO League pitchers
Doosan Bears players
1992 births